The Man with the Hispano may refer to:

 The Man with the Hispano (1926 film), a French silent drama film 
 The Man with the Hispano (1933 film), a French drama film